In Native American mythology (particularly in the Cherokee tribe) the Ani Hyuntikwalaski ("Thunder Beings") are beings that cause lightning fire in a hollow sycamore tree.

Ani Hyuntikwalaski is also the name of the Western Marker of The Lost Island Stonecircle.

References

Cherokee legendary creatures